Martín Cristián Alonso Parra Plaza (born 1 September 2000) is a Chilean professional footballer who plays as a goalkeeper for Chilean Primera División side Huachipato.

Club career
A product of Huachipato youth system, Parra made his professional debut in the Chilean Primera División match versus Universidad de Chile on 3 April 2021, after Gabriel Castellón tested positive for COVID-19. Immediately he made an appearance for the 2021 Copa Sudamericana in the match versus Deportes Antofagasta on 6 April.

During the first half 2022, he was loaned to Peruvian club Universidad San Martín. On second half 2022, he was loaned to Universidad de Chile until December.

References

External links
 
 Martín Parra at PlayMakerStats

2000 births
Living people
People from Talcahuano
Chilean footballers
Chilean expatriate footballers
Association football goalkeepers
C.D. Huachipato footballers
Club Deportivo Universidad de San Martín de Porres players
Universidad de Chile footballers
Chilean Primera División players
Peruvian Primera División players
Chilean expatriate sportspeople in Peru
Expatriate footballers in Peru